Pseudoneuroterus nichollsi is a gall wasp species in the family Cynipidae whose life cycle involves only Palaearctic oaks, Quercus subgen. Quercus, in the section Cerris.

References 

Cynipidae
Gall-inducing insects